Robert James Rutherford (died August 1995) was an eminent surgeon and chairman of Newcastle United F.C. from 1978 to 1981.

Career
Rutherford was educated at the Royal Grammar School and Durham University where he studied medicine.

Rutherford became an eminent surgeon in Newcastle upon Tyne. He became a director of Newcastle United in April 1950 and became chairman when Lord Westwood stood down in January 1978.

In 1981, each director of Newcastle United were asked to put up a £16,000 guarantee in favour of the bank to help the club's financial position. Rutherford refused and resigned both as a director and as chairman. He lived in Gosforth and died in August 1995.

References

1995 deaths
Newcastle United F.C. directors and chairmen
People educated at the Royal Grammar School, Newcastle upon Tyne
Alumni of Durham University